Billy Bray's Chapel or Billy Bray's 'Three Eyes' Chapel is a Grade II listed Methodist chapel at Baldhu in Cornwall, UK. The chapel is one of the three chapels left that Billy Bray built. The chapel is located about six miles from Truro and one mile from Chacewater near a crossroads. The chapel was built in the early 19th century and was attended by many people including Billy Bray himself who was the preached here. Towards the end of the 1980s the chapel closed down but was reopened and rededicated. The chapel still today holds services.

The door and the porch was originally under the middle window but was moved and altered. It is thought the chapel has also been altered since Billy Bray was here. The name 'three eyes' comes from the three windows of the chapel. Three on one side and three on the other. Billy Bray is buried in St Michael's church in Baldhu which is now turned into houses.

The church contains a piano and the shell of a Harmonium.

References 

 http://www.methodistheritage.org.uk/billybrayschapel.htm
 http://www.billybray.org.uk/

Methodist churches in Cornwall